Sthenopis is a genus of moths of the family Hepialidae. There are eight described species found in North America and China.

Species

Sthenopis argenteomaculatus (silver-spotted ghost moth) – Canada/United States
Recorded food plants: Alnus, Betula, Salix
Sthenopis auratus (gold-spotted ghost moth) – United States
Recorded food plants: Athyrium, Dryopteris, Matteuccia
Sthenopis bouvieri – China
Sthenopis dirschi – China
Sthenopis purpurascens – Canada/United States
Recorded food plants: Populus, Salix
Sthenopis regius – China
Sthenopis roseus – China
Sthenopis thule (willow ghost moth) – Canada/United States
Food plant: Salix

Hepialidae
Exoporia genera
Taxa named by Alpheus Spring Packard